John Holbrook may refer to:
 John Holbrook (bishop), Church of England bishop
 John Holbrook (publisher), American publisher and entrepreneur
 John Edwards Holbrook, American zoologist

See also